State Highway 89 (abbreviated SH-89 or OK-89) is a state highway in the southern part of the U.S. state of Oklahoma. SH-89 was initially designated on July 26, 1944. It has no lettered spur routes.

Route description
State Highway 89 begins at the Taovayas Indian Bridge on the Illinois Bend of the Red River, continuing Farm to Market Road 677 from Texas. One mile (1.6 km) north of the river, it intersects SH-32 at Courtney. SH-32 then angles off to the northwest while SH-89 continues on a due north course.

The highway continues along a rough northerly heading, though it briefly heads northwest at times. SH-89 runs to the east of the town of Cornish, and then intersects US-70 as it enters Ringling. After passing through the town, it curves northwest. SH-89 then turns back to a due north course, which it will maintain for the rest of its existence.

History
State Highway 89 was first added to the Oklahoma state highway system on July 26, 1944. The original extent of the highway was from the current northern junction with SH-32 to US-70 in Ringling. These remained the route's termini until January 21, 1957, when it was extended north through Ringling to SH-53, setting its northern terminus at its present location. Minor realignments would take place during the next two years, after which the highway would remain the same for three decades.

On September 6, 1994, the highway was extended south. SH-89 now overlapped SH-32 to Courtney, where it split away towards its new southern terminus at the Texas state line. The highway has undergone no further changes since this extension.

Junction list

References

External links

SH-89 at Roadklahoma

089
Transportation in Love County, Oklahoma
Transportation in Jefferson County, Oklahoma
Transportation in Stephens County, Oklahoma